William Randall Henderson (March 19, 1926 – April 3, 2016) was an American jazz singer and actor in television and film.

Biography
Henderson was born in Chicago, Illinois. Henderson began his professional music career in 1952, performing in Chicago with Ramsey Lewis, and began recording as a leader after a move to New York in 1958. He subsequently recorded with jazz pianist Horace Silver on a vocal version of Silver's "Señor Blues" which was a jukebox hit (in the mid-1950s), and remains one of jazz label Blue Note's top-selling singles. Additionally, Henderson performed and recorded with Oscar Peterson (Bill Henderson with the Oscar Peterson Trio), Jimmy Smith, Count Basie, Yusef Lateef, and Eddie Harris. He was under contract to the Vee Jay label between 1958 and 1961, who recorded his first album as leader, Bill Henderson Sings (1958), which features trumpeter Booker Little among the sidemen.

Beginning in the mid-1970s, he frequently appeared on television in supporting, usually one-time roles.  His film roles have followed a similar trend — minor and supporting roles. Henderson also recorded his own vocal tracks as "King Blues" for the comedy film Get Crazy (1983). Henderson made a guest vocal appearance on Charlie Haden's album The Art of the Song (1999).

Discography
Albums
Bill Henderson Sings (with Ramsey Lewis Trio, Wynton Kelly Sextet; arranged by Benny Golson, Frank Wess) (Vee-Jay #1015, 1959)
Bill Henderson [self-titled] (with Eddie Higgins Quartet, Tommy Flanagan Quartet, Thad Jones Big Band, Jimmy Jones Strings) (Vee-Jay #1031, 1961)
Please Send Me Someone To Love (with Eddie Harris, Eddie Higgins, Joe Diorio, Rail Wilson, Al Duncan) (Vee-Jay International #3055, 1960-1961 [rel. 1974]; reissued as Collectables #7144, 2000)
Bill Henderson with the Oscar Peterson Trio (with Oscar Peterson, Ray Brown, Ed Thigpen) (MGM #4128, 1963; reissued as Verve/Polygram #837937, 1989)
When My Dreamboat Comes Home (with Jimmy Jones Orchestra; arranged by Rene Hall, Jimmy Jones, Bobby Scott) (Verve #8619, 1965)
Live In Concert With The Count Basie Band (Monad #802, 1966 [rel. 1995])
Live At The Times (with Joyce Collins, Dave Mackay, Tom Azarello, Jimmie Smith) (Discovery #779, 1975 [rel. 1977])
Bill Henderson Live: Joey Revisited (with Joyce Collins, Dave Mackay, Steve LaSpina, Jerry Coleman) (Monad #807, 1976 [rel. 1995])
Street Of Dreams (with Joyce Collins, Dave Mackay, Jim Hughart, Jimmie Smith, Pete Christlieb) (Discovery #802, 1979)
A Tribute To Johnny Mercer (with Joyce Collins, Dave Mackay, Joey Baron) (Discovery #846, 1981)
Nancy Wilson, Presents Great Jazz Night: Red Hot & Cool II (featuring Bill Henderson) (LaserDisc, 1990)
White Men Can't Jump [original soundtrack] (Bill as member of the Venice Beach Boys) (Capitol/EMI #98414, 1992)
Charlie Haden Quartet West, The Art of the Song (featuring Shirley Horn, Bill Henderson) (Verve/Polygram #547403, 1999)
Mike Melvoin With Charlie Haden Featuring Bill Henderson, The Capitol Sessions (Naim Audio Ltd, 2000)
Chico Hamilton, Juniflip (featuring Bill Henderson) (Joyous Shout, 2006)
Live At The Kennedy Center (with Ed Vodicka Trio) (Web Only Jazz, 2006)
Beautiful Memory: Bill Henderson Live At The Vic (with Tateng Katindig, Chris Conner, Roy McCurdy) (Ahuh Productions, 2008)

Compilations
Something's Gotta Give (Discovery #932, 1986) - compilation of Discovery #802 [7 songs], and Discovery #846 [7 songs].
Sings (Best Of) (Suite Beat #2016, 1986) - compilation of Vee-Jay #1015 [6 songs], Vee-Jay #1031 [4 songs], and Vee-Jay International #3055 [4 songs].
His Complete Vee-Jay Recordings, Volume One (Vee-Jay LLP #NVJ2-909, 1993; reissued as Koch Jazz #8548, 2000)
His Complete Vee-Jay Recordings, Volume Two (Vee-Jay LLP #NVJ2-912, 1993; reissued as Koch Jazz #8572, 2000)

Singles
Bill Henderson Sings...with the Horace Silver Quintet, "Señor Blues"/"Tippin'" (Blue Note, 1958)  - note: both released on CD reissue of 6 Pieces of Silver 
Bill Henderson Sings...with the Jimmy Smith Trio, "Ain't No Use"/"Angel Eyes" (Blue Note, 1958)  - note: both released on CD reissue of Softly as a Summer Breeze
Bill Henderson Sings...with the Jimmy Smith Trio, "Ain't That Love"/"Willow Weep for Me" (Blue Note, 1958)  - note: both released on CD reissue of Softly as a Summer Breeze
"How Long Has This Been Going On?"/"Busy Signal" (Riverside, 1958)
"Bye Bye Blackbird"/"Bad Luck" (Vee Jay, 1959)
"Joey" [AKA "Joey, Joey, Joey"]/"Sweet Pumpkin" (Vee Jay, 1960)
"Sleepy"/"It Never Entered My Mind" (Vee Jay, 1960)
"My How The Time Goes By"/"Sweet Georgia Brown" (Vee Jay, 1961)
"When My Dream Boat Comes Home"/"Who Can I Turn To (When Nobody Needs Me)" (Verve, 1965)
"Lay Down Your Weary Tune"/"If I Could Be With You (One Hour Tonight)" (Verve, 1965)
"Bend Over Backwards"/"What Are You Doing the Rest of Your Life?" (Warner Bros., 1970)
"Send in the Clowns"/"Send in the Clowns" (12" single [side A: 33rpm, side B: 45rpm], Discovery/Classic/Jazz Planet, 1996) - from Live At The Times

Filmography

Film
Trouble Man (1972) – Jimmy, Pool Room Owner
Cornbread, Earl and Me (1975) – Mr Watkins
Silver Streak (1976) – Red Cap
Mother, Jugs & Speed (1976) – Charles Taylor
Inside Moves (1980) - Blue Lewis
Continental Divide (1981) – Train Conductor
Get Crazy (1983) – King Blues
The Adventures of Buckaroo Banzai Across the 8th Dimension (1984) – Casper Lindley
Clue (1985) – The Cop
Fletch (1985) – Speaker
Wisdom (1986) – Theo
Murphy's Law (1986) – Ben Wilcove
How I Got Into College (1989) – Detroit High School Coach
No Holds Barred (1989) – Charlie
Cousins (1989) – Valhalla Band
City Slickers (1991) – Dr. Ben Jessup
White Men Can't Jump (1992) – Member of the Venice Beach Boys
Maverick (1994) – Mr. Hightower, Riverboat Poker Player
"Weird Al" Yankovic: There's No Going Home (1996) – Blind Lemon Yankovic (uncredited)
Ghosts of Mississippi (1996) – Minister
Hoodlum (1997) – Mr. Redmond
Conspiracy Theory (1997) – Hospital Security
Lethal Weapon 4 (1998) – Angry Patient
Trippin' (1999) – Gramps Reed
Hard Ground (2003) – Junior Gunn
The Alibi (2006) – Counterman

Television
Happy Days (1974) – Mr. Davis
Harry O (1974-1976) – Spencer Johnson / Teak
Sanford and Son (1975) – Harvey
Good Times (1976-1977) – Ray the Bartender / Night Club Owner
The Jeffersons (1977) – JoJo
What's Happening!! (1977) – Clarence Hopkins
Diff'rent Strokes (1979) – Attendant
The Incredible Hulk (1979) – Antoine Moray / Babalao
Ad Lib (1981)
Benson (1982) – Jay
Hill Street Blues (1983) – Maynard
The Facts of Life (1985) – Art "Jazzbeau" Jackson
MacGyver (1987) – Gas Station Cashier
In the Heat of the Night (1993) – Bishop William Prinn
NYPD Blue (1996) – Verdis
Mad About You (1998) – Mets Shortstop
Beyond Belief: Fact or Fiction (1998) – Lloyd Weeks
ER (1999) – Charley Barnes
Malcolm & Eddie (1999) – Uncle Buddy (voice)
7th Heaven (2000) – Caleb
Cold Case (2003) – George 'Tinkerbell' Polk (2003)
My Name Is Earl (2007) – Charlie (final appearance)

References

External links

 
Bill Henderson's MySpace page

1926 births
2016 deaths
American jazz singers
American male film actors
American male television actors
People from Chicago
Jazz musicians from Illinois